Östersunds BS is a bandy club in Östersund, Sweden, established on 5 September 1974 when Ope IF's bandy section was disestablished. The women's bandy team debuted in the Swedish top division during the season of 2013-2014.

References

External links
Östersunds BS 

1974 establishments in Sweden
Bandy clubs in Sweden
Bandy clubs established in 1974
Sport in Östersund